The 2000–01 Codan Ligaen season was the 44th season of ice hockey in Denmark. Nine teams participated in the league, and the Herning Blue Fox won the championship.

First round

Zweite Saisonphase

Group A

Group B

Playoffs

3rd place 
 Esbjerg IK - Rungsted IK 2:1 (4:3 n.P., 4:8, 3:0)

Final 
 Herning Blue Fox - Rødovre Mighty Bulls 3:1 (4:1, 4:5 n.P., 7:5, 3:0)

External links
Season on hockeyarchives.info

Dan
Eliteserien (Denmark) seasons
2000 in Danish sport
2001 in Danish sport